SMP Negeri 18 Medan or SMPN 18 Medan is a junior high school located in the Sea of Tranquility

References 

Education in North Sumatra